Ceritoturris thailandica is a species of sea snail, a marine gastropod mollusk in the family Horaiclavidae.

Description

Distribution
This marine species occurs in the Gulf of Thailand.

References

External links

thailandica
Gastropods described in 2006